The Battle of Newton's Station was an engagement on April 24, 1863, in Newton's Station, Mississippi, during Grierson's Raid of the American Civil War.

Union cavalry raiders under the command of Col. Benjamin Grierson, in an effort to disrupt Confederate communications, probed deep in enemy territory and entered the town of Newton's Station (now Newton). They succeeded in securing the town without any serious fighting, and captured two Confederate trains. The raiders also destroyed several miles of railroad track and telegraph wires in the vicinity, severing communications between Confederate-held Vicksburg and the Eastern Theatre commanders.

The two trains (one a freight and the second a mixed freight and passenger) were actually captured by Lt-Colonel William Blackburn, who had ridden ahead in darkness to scout the town. His men set fire to the trains, and exploding ammunition led the nearby Grierson to assume the worst, that a major battle had started. He arrived with the main force to find Blackburn's men helping themselves to confiscated whiskey.

Over the next few hours Union forces destroyed trackage and equipment, east to the Chunky River and west as far as possible. A large building in the town with uniforms and arms was burned, and the railroad depot was burned (not before local hospital staff were allowed to remove medicine and food). Assembling his forces Grierson departed the area around 2pm, leaving ruin and wreckage.

The Battle of Newton's Station and Grierson's cavalry exploits starting in La Grange, Tennessee were the basis of the 1959 movie The Horse Soldiers, directed by John Ford, starring John Wayne and William Holden.

References

External links 
 Photos of Newton's Station

Vicksburg campaign
Battles of the Western Theater of the American Civil War
Union victories of the American Civil War
Battles of the American Civil War in Mississippi
Battle Of Newton's Station
Conflicts in 1863
1863 in Mississippi
April 1863 events